The Nysa Bridge is a late imperial Roman bridge over the Cakircak stream in Nysa (modern Sultanhisar) in the ancient region of Caria, modern-day Turkey.

Dating 
The Greek geographer Strabo (63 BC–AD 21), who lived in Nysa, mentioned a secret water conduit in the town, but it remains unclear whether he meant the existing tunnel-like bridge. An inscription at the northern wall of the tube, close to a bend after , indicates a construction date in late imperial times. It reads "Work of Praülos until this point".

Construction 

The Nysa Bridge served as a substructure for the area in front of the city theatre, which lay close to the Cakircak stream. It was built as a two-level structure: the bottom vault spanned the brook. On top of it a row of arches connected the two hills that formed the urban area. The vault is made of rubble stone laid in mortar, resting on a substructure of ashlar stone blocks of varying size (0.3–0.9 x 1.0–1.4 m). Originally featuring a continuous vaulting, it is collapsed today between m 75 and 85, and again at the downhill exit. The remaining, isolated structure at the downstream side has often been incorrectly referred to as a bridge of its own. The Nysa Bridge was the second largest bridge substruction of its kind in antiquity, only surpassed by the nearby Pergamon Bridge. By comparison, the width of a normal, free standing Roman bridge did not exceed .

In its further course, the Cakircak also ran through the city stadion, so that naumachia could be given. There are remains of two other ancient bridges both up- and downstream.

Discharge capacity 
The capacity limit of the Nysa Bridge in case of floods has been the subject of hydraulic and hydrological research. The gradient of the tunnel was calculated as 3.3% with a maximum discharge capacity of 290 m³/s. Exceeding this limit puts the bridge under internal pressure and damages the structure in the process.

7,500 years (Günerman method)
10,500 years (D.S.I. method)
13,000 years (Mockus method)
68,000 years (Snyder method)

The study came to the conclusion that statistically every 13,500 years, a value which has been referred to as the "arithmetic mean", floods are to be expected which would exceed the capacity of the bridge.

See also 
 List of Roman bridges
 Roman architecture
 Roman engineering

References

Sources

Further reading

External links 

Roman bridges in Turkey
Deck arch bridges
Stone bridges in Turkey
Roman Caria
Tunnels in Turkey
Buildings and structures in Aydın Province
Arch bridges in Turkey